Aix-Marseille University Faculty of Sciences is one of the faculties of Aix-Marseille University. The faculty is divided into seven departments across six campuses. With 8000 students and 1600 staff and faculty it is one of the largest science faculties in France.

The notable faculty include Carlo Rovelli.

Departments
Biology
Chemistry
Engineering
Information systems
Mathematics
Physics
SATIS :  Sciences, Arts and Audiovisual

Campuses
The campuses are administratively divided into three sites, Etoile, St Charles and Luminy. Etoile encompasses the campuses of Saint Jérôme, Château Gombert, and Montperrin, the only site in Aix-en-Provence. St Charles encompasses the campuses of St Charles and Aubagne.

See also
Altitude SEE Test European Platform (ASTEP), a joint research laboratory created by Aix-Marseille University, CNRS and STMicroelectronics

External links
 

Sciences
Research institutes in France
2012 establishments in France
Educational institutions established in 2012